Kayupulau or Kayo Pulau is a nearly extinct Austronesian language spoken mainly by adults in Jayapura Harbor in Papua province, Indonesia.  By 2007, it was used by less than a tenth of the ethnic population.

References

Sarmi–Jayapura languages
Languages of western New Guinea
Jayapura
Papua (province) culture
Endangered Austronesian languages